Frances Reid (1914–2010) was an American actress.

Frances Reid or Reed may also refer to:

Frances Reid (director), American documentary filmmaker and cinematographer
Fran Reed (1943–2008), American fiber artist and teacher

See also
Frances Reed Elliot (1892–1965), first African American women accepted into the American Red Cross Nursing Service
Francis Reid (1900–1970), male British Army officer